Selaiyur is a neighbourhood of Chennai, India. This place is located on the Tambaram–Velachery Road. Long ago, this place was called as Silaiyur. Neighbouring towns include Tambaram, Madambakkam, Rajakilpakkam, Sembakkam, Chitlapakkam and Medavakkam.

The Indian Air Force has one of if its bases here. It has been a preferred area for most of the retired airforce families and hence there are mix of people like north Indians, Andhraites, Keralites, and so forth. Over the past few years, this suburb has rapidly developed in terms of population due to the presence of vast number of private companies (national and multi national) present nearby.

The nearest railway station is the Tambaram railway station and the Chennai airport is about 9 km away. Selaiyur has bus connectivity to all the main regions of the city. The East Tambaram bus terminus is about 3 km away and passengers can also board the buses in Camp Road Junction bus stop located in the neighbourhood.

Selaiyur Tank
Selaiyur has an ancient temple tank in its midst. This tank belonged to the nearby Perumal temple. It is said that a record, 400 years ago by Chola king Thribhuvana Chakravarthy Vijaykanda Gopalan states that the tank belonged to the Perumal temple.

Transport
Selaiyur is well connected by MTC. The nearest railway station is 3 kilometres away at Tambaram. The nearest airport is Chennai International Airport at Meenambakkam. The main mode of transport and conveyance are buses and share-autos. The following buses ply towards Camp Road. Camp Road is the main junction in the locality where many important banks like SBI, HDFC, AXIS are situated.

Temples
 Abhirami Udanurai Amirthakadeswarar Temple
 Amirthavalli Thayar samedha Adikesavaperumal Temple
 Arulmigu Abirami Amman Udanurai Amirdhagadeswarar Temple
 Arulmigu Adhi Kesava Perumal Temple
 Arulmigu Nellore Amman Temple,
 Kailasanather Temple
 Lord Dhenupureeswarar Temple
 Perumaul Koil
 Rama Koti Nama Bhaktha Anjeya Swami Temple
 Shri Karpaga Vinayagar Temple, Selaiyur
 Shri Muthall amman Temple
 Shri Thenupureeswarar Temple
 Shri Veerabhadra Swamy Temple
 Shri Vembuli Amman Thunai Temple
 Siva Temple
 Skandhashramam
 Sri Lakshmi Narasimha Temple
 Sri Saibaba Temple

Education
 Alpha Matriculation and Higher Secondary School
 Alwin Memorial Public School
 Apollo Computer Education
 Bharat University
 Boaz Public School, Gowrivakkam
 Christ King Convent 
 Christ King Girls Higher Secondary School
 Corley Higher Secondary School
 Kendriya Vidyalaya
 Little Kids Learning Center
 Lydia Matriculation School
 Natyaranjani School of Bharathanatyam
 Pavitra Nursery School
 Sitadevi Garodia Hindu Vidyalaya
 Sree Gugans CBSE School
 Sri Lakshmi Ammal Engineering College
 Sri Sankara Vidyalaya Matriculation Higher Secondary School
 St. Marks Matriculation School
 Tamil Nadu State Govt. Corporation School
 UV Global Preschool, Mohan Nagar
 Zion Matriculation School

Hospitals
Bharat Super Speciality Hospital
Bethesda Hospital
Arka laser dental care
Cure Advanced Dental Care
DR. K. K. Surgical And Paediatric Centre
Dental Hospitals -Shri Raghavendra, Vivident, Johann Dental, Dentistry, Arka dento-facial care. 
New Life Hospital
Medicity Multispeciality Hospital
Christudas Orthopaedic Speciality Hospital

References

Neighbourhoods in Chennai
Suburbs of Chennai